Walter Norman Ledingham (born October 26, 1950) is a Canadian former professional ice hockey player who played 15 games in the National Hockey League.  He played with the Chicago Black Hawks and New York Islanders. Ledingham was born in Midale, Saskatchewan, but grew up in Weyburn, Saskatchewan.

Awards and honors

References

External links

1950 births
Living people
AHCA Division I men's ice hockey All-Americans
Canadian ice hockey left wingers
Chicago Blackhawks draft picks
Chicago Blackhawks players
Ice hockey people from Saskatchewan
New York Islanders players
Sportspeople from Weyburn